Irene Ajambo (born ) is a Ugandan female weightlifter, competing in the 69 kg category and representing Uganda at international competitions.

She participated at the 2004 Summer Olympics in the 69 kg event. 
She competed at world championships, most recently at the 2005 World Weightlifting Championships.

Major results

References

External links
 
 http://allafrica.com/stories/200408230147.html

 http://www.weinformers.com/2010/12/29/ugandas-weightlifting-clubs-in-shambles-as-shown-by-black-monster-club-in-jinja/
 http://www.alamy.com/stock-photo-ugandas-irene-ajambo-powers-a-lift-during-the-womens-69-kg-weightlifting-121485011.html
 http://news.bbc.co.uk/sport2/hi/olympics_2004/weightlifting/results/3532094.stm
http://ugandaradionetwork.com.dedi3883.your-server.de/story/woman-weightlifter-irene-ajambo-to-miss-algeria-games 

1987 births
Living people
Ugandan female weightlifters
Weightlifters at the 2004 Summer Olympics
Weightlifters at the 2006 Commonwealth Games
Olympic weightlifters of Uganda
Place of birth missing (living people)
Commonwealth Games competitors for Uganda